FC Mashinostroitel Pskov was a Russian football team from Pskov. It played professionally from 1970 to 1974 and from 1990 to 1997, 2000—2005. Their best result was 2nd place in Zone West of the Russian Second Division in 2001.

Champions of Amateur Football League — Zone North-West and Final round (1999). Winner North-West Cup (1999).

Team name history
 1970: FC Elektron Pskov
 1971–1998: FC Mashinostroitel Pskov
 1998–2000: FC Pskov
 2001–2005: FC Pskov-2000

External links
  Team history at KLISF

Association football clubs established in 1970
Association football clubs disestablished in 1999
Defunct football clubs in Russia
Sport in Pskov
1970 establishments in Russia
1999 disestablishments in Russia